The 2016–17 Davidson Wildcats men's basketball team represented Davidson College during the 2016–17 NCAA Division I men's basketball season. The Wildcats, led by 28th-year head coach Bob McKillop, played their home games at the John M. Belk Arena in Davidson, North Carolina as third-year members of the Atlantic 10 Conference. They finished the regular season 17–15, 8–10 in A-10 play to finish in ninth place. They received the No. 9 seed in the A-10 tournament where they defeated La Salle and Dayton to advance to the semifinals where they lost to Rhode Island.

Previous season
The Wildcats finished the 2015–16 season with a record of 20–13, 10–8 record in A-10 play, finishing in sixth place. They lost to eventual tournament champion, Saint Joseph's, in the semifinals of the A-10 tournament. They received an invitation to the National Invitation Tournament where they lost in the first round to Florida State.

Offseason

Departures

2016 recruiting class

2017 recruiting class

Preseason 
Davidson was picked to finish in fourth place in the Preseason A-10 poll.

Roster

Schedule and results

|-
!colspan=9 style=| Exhibition

|-
!colspan=9 style=| Non-conference regular season

|-
!colspan=9 style=| Atlantic 10 regular season

|-
!colspan=9 style=| Atlantic 10 tournament

See also
 2016–17 Davidson Wildcats women's basketball team

References

Davidson Wildcats men's basketball seasons
Davidson
2016 in sports in North Carolina
2017 in sports in North Carolina